Gilberto Alavez is a paralympic athlete from Oaxaca, Mexico competing mainly in category T44 cycling sprint and middle-distance events.

Gilberto won a silver medal in the 800m at the 2000 Summer Paralympics where he also competed in the 400m.  A move to shorter distances in the 2004 Summer Paralympics proved unsuccessful as he failed to medal in the 100m, 400m or the 4 × 400 m.

References

Paralympic athletes of Mexico
Athletes (track and field) at the 2000 Summer Paralympics
Athletes (track and field) at the 2004 Summer Paralympics
Paralympic silver medalists for Mexico
Living people
Medalists at the 2000 Summer Paralympics
Sportspeople from Oaxaca
Year of birth missing (living people)
Paralympic medalists in athletics (track and field)
Mexican male sprinters
Mexican male middle-distance runners
Sprinters with limb difference
Middle-distance runners with limb difference
Paralympic sprinters
Paralympic middle-distance runners